The Solz is a river in Hesse, Germany. It flows into the Fulda near Bad Hersfeld, about 15 km upstream from another Fulda tributary named Solz.

See also
List of rivers of Hesse

References

Rivers of Hesse
Rivers of Germany